Clifton "Red" White was an American football and basketball coach. He was the first head football coach at Adams State College—now known as Adams State University—in Alamosa, Colorado and he held that position for eight seasons, from 1930 until 1937.  His coaching record at Adams State was 12–20–5.

References

Year of birth missing
Year of death missing
Adams State Grizzlies football coaches
Nebraska–Kearney Lopers men's basketball coaches